Mainpuri Assembly constituency is  one of the 403 constituencies of the Uttar Pradesh Legislative Assembly,  India. It is a part of the Mainpuri district and  one of the five assembly constituencies in the Mainpuri Lok Sabha constituency. First election in this assembly constituency was held in 1952 after the "DPACO (1951)" (delimitation order) was passed in 1951. After the "Delimitation of Parliamentary and Assembly Constituencies Order" was passed in 2008, the constituency was assigned identification number 107.

Wards  / Areas
Extent  of Mainpuri Assembly constituency is KCs Kurawali, Mainpuri, Kuraoli NP,  Jyoti Khuria NP & Mainpuri (MB+OG) of Mainpuri Tehsil.

Members of the Legislative Assembly

16th Vidhan Sabha: 2012 General  Elections

See also
Mainpuri district
Mainpuri Lok Sabha constituency
Sixteenth Legislative Assembly of Uttar Pradesh
Uttar Pradesh Legislative Assembly
Vidhan Bhawan

References

External links
 

Assembly constituencies of Uttar Pradesh
Mainpuri
Constituencies established in 1951